Members of the New South Wales Legislative Council who served from 1930 to 1932 were appointed for life by the Governor on the advice of the Premier. This list includes members between the 1930 state election on 25 October 1930 and the 1932 state election on 11 June 1932. The President was Sir John Peden. The Premier Jack Lang had been seeking to swamp the council, however the Governor Sir Philip Game had declined to do so in November 1930, March, June and September 1931 when Lang sought 70 new members be appointed. In November 1931 Lang dropped his request to 25 new members and the governor agreed to the request. This raised the number of members of the council from 85 to 110.

In 1930 Labor put forward two bills, one to repeal section 7A of the NSW Constitution (which prevented the abolition of the Council without a referendum), the other to abolish the Council. Believing that a referendum was necessary before the bills could become law, the Legislative Council permitted the bills to pass without a division on 10 December. Lang then announced his intention of presenting the bills for Game's Royal assent without a referendum. The following day, two members of the Legislative Council, Thomas Playfair and Arthur Trethowan, applied for and were granted an injunction by the Supreme Court preventing the President of the Council and the ministers from presenting the bills to the Governor without having held a referendum. Peden, despite being named as the first defendant, did not defend the case as he was convinced of section 7A's validity under the Colonial Laws Validity Act 1865. The injunction was upheld by the Full Court of the Supreme Court on 23 December. Lang's appeal to the High Court of Australia was rejected by a majority of the court in Attorney-General (New South Wales) v Trethowan on 16 March 1931. Lang then appealed this decision to the Judicial Committee of the Privy Council in London, which delayed hearing the appeal until April 1932. The appeal was finally resolved with the judgment of the Judicial Committee of the Privy Council on 31 May 1932 which dismissed the appeal. The bills repealing Section 7A and abolishing the Legislative Council could not therefore be presented to the Governor for assent as they had been passed in a referendum.

See also
Third Lang Ministry

Notes

References

Members of New South Wales parliaments by term
20th-century Australian politicians